Charles Mackay (29 June 1875 – 3 May 1929) was a New Zealand lawyer, local politician, and mayor of Wanganui between 1906 and 1920.

Born Charles Ewing Mackay (later known as Charles Evan Mackay) in Nelson in 1875, Mackay achieved a BA and LLB in law. He started a law firm in Wanganui in 1902. Gaining election to the Wanganui Borough Council in November 1905, he successfully contested the mayoralty in 1906.

He became notorious after shooting writer Walter D'Arcy Cresswell, who apparently threatened to out him as homosexual. In 1920, Mackay was convicted of Cresswell's attempted murder. Mackay served time in Mount Eden prison. He was released in 1926, after serving six years with hard labour of his 15-year sentence. A condition of his release was that he leave the country and, in 1928, he moved to England.

Mackay was soon working in Berlin as a language teacher and part-time correspondent. In his latter function, he covered communist street riots raging after May Day 1929 and was mistakenly shot dead by a policeman.

References

1875 births
1929 deaths
Mayors of Wanganui
New Zealand politicians convicted of crimes
20th-century New Zealand lawyers
New Zealand LGBT politicians
Unsuccessful candidates in the 1908 New Zealand general election
People from Nelson, New Zealand
People convicted of attempted murder
LGBT mayors of places in New Zealand
People shot dead by law enforcement officers in Germany